The following sortable table comprises the 477 mountain peaks of the United States with at least  of topographic elevation and at least  of topographic prominence.

The summit of a mountain or hill may be measured in three principal ways:
The topographic elevation of a summit measures the height of the summit above a geodetic sea level.
The topographic prominence of a summit is a measure of how high the summit rises above its surroundings.
The topographic isolation (or radius of dominance) of a summit measures how far the summit lies from its nearest point of equal elevation.

In the United States, only Denali exceeds  elevation. Four major summits exceed , nine exceed , 104 exceed , 246 exceed , and the following 477 major summits exceed  elevation.



Major 3000-meter summits

A total of 477 mountain summits in the United States meet both criteria for the definition of "major summit" used here: at least  of topographic elevation and at least  of topographic prominence. Of these 477 summits, 117 are located in Colorado, 67 in Alaska, 51 in California, 43 in Wyoming, 42 in Montana, 40 in Utah, 38 in Nevada, 36 in Idaho, 26 in New Mexico, five in Arizona, five in Oregon, four in Washington, and three in Hawaii. Five of these summits are located on the international border between Alaska and the Yukon, and three are located on the international border between Alaska and British Columbia. The ten highest major summits of the United States are all located in Alaska.

The northernmost summit with at least 3000 metres elevation and 500 metres prominence is Hess Mountain in central Alaska; the southernmost is Mauna Loa on the Island of Hawaii; the westernmost is Haleakalā on the Island of Maui; and the easternmost is East Spanish Peak in south-central Colorado. In the contiguous United States (i.e. excluding Alaska and Hawaii), the northernmost, southernmost, westernmost, and easternmost major summits are Kintla Peak in Montana, Mount Graham in Arizona, Mount Shasta in California, and East Spanish Peak in Colorado, respectively.

Gallery

See also

List of mountain peaks of North America
List of mountain peaks of Greenland
List of mountain peaks of Canada
List of mountain peaks of the Rocky Mountains
List of mountain peaks of the United States
List of the highest major summits of the United States
List of the major 4000-meter summits of the United States

List of United States fourteeners
List of the most prominent summits of the United States
List of the ultra-prominent summits of the United States
List of the most isolated major summits of the United States
List of the major 100-kilometer summits of the United States
List of extreme summits of the United States
List of mountain peaks of Alaska
List of mountain peaks of California
List of mountain peaks of Colorado
List of mountain peaks of Hawaii
List of mountain peaks of Montana
List of mountain peaks of Nevada
List of mountain peaks of Utah
List of mountain peaks of Washington (state)
List of mountain peaks of Wyoming
List of mountain peaks of México
List of mountain peaks of Central America
List of mountain peaks of the Caribbean
United States of America
Geography of the United States
Geology of the United States
:Category:Mountains of the United States
commons:Category:Mountains of the United States
Physical geography
Topography
Topographic elevation
Topographic prominence
Topographic isolation

Notes

References

External links

United States Geological Survey (USGS)
Geographic Names Information System @ USGS
United States National Geodetic Survey (NGS)
Geodetic Glossary @ NGS
NGVD 29 to NAVD 88 online elevation converter @ NGS
Survey Marks and Datasheets @ NGS
Bivouac.com
Peakbagger.com
Peaklist.org
Peakware.com
Summitpost.org

 
Lists of mountains of the United States
United States, List Of The Major 3000-Meter Summits Of The